This is a list of European Union regions (NUTS2 regions) sorted by their gross domestic product (GDP). Eurostat calculates the GDP based on the information provided by national statistics institutes affiliated to Eurostat.

The list presents statistics for 2021 from Eurostat, . The figures are in millions of nominal euros, purchasing power standards and purchasing power standard per capita.



2021 list

See also 
 Economy of the European Union
 List of EU metropolitan areas by GDP
 List of NUTS regions in the European Union by GDP

References

Sources
 Eurostat news release, retrieved 18 March 2018

External links

 Press release: Regional GDP per capita in the EU in 2010
 Press release: Twenty-one regions below half of the EU average……and five regions over double the average

Economy of Europe-related lists